Just Say Mao was Sire Records' Volume 3 of Just Say Yes and was originally released on July 11, 1989 as a  CD sampler.  It contained remixes and non-album tracks of artists on the label, most of which were considered new wave or modern rock (all would eventually fall under the genre alternative rock).

Track listing
 Everything Counts [Bomb Beyond the Yalu Mix] - Depeche Mode
 In a Manner of Speaking - Martin L. Gore
 Accidentally 4th Street (Gloria) [Remix] - Figures on a Beach
 Thrash - Underworld
 Pistol - Erasure
 Insha-Allah - Nasa
 Dizzy [Remix] - Throwing Muses
 Whistling for His Love [Remix] - Danielle Dax
 Lucky Lisp - Morrissey
 Between Something and Nothing - The Ocean Blue
 Da'ale Da'ale [Remix] - Ofra Haza
 Don't Say No [Remix] - Tom Tom Club
 Hunted Child - Ice-T
 Nanana - Royal Crescent Mob
 Date to Church - The Replacements, Tom Waits
 Nowhere to Stand - k.d. lang
 Strawman - Lou Reed

Its continued success further fueled a series of subsequent albums, the subtitles of which were variations on the 'Just Say' theme:

Just Say Yes Volume I: Just Say Yes (1987)
Just Say Yes Volume II: Just Say Yo (1988)
Just Say Yes Volume IV: Just Say Da (1990)
Just Say Yes Volume V: Just Say Anything (1991)
Just Say Yes Volume VI: Just Say Yesterday (1992)
Just Say Yes Volume VII: Just Say Roe (1994)

References

1989 compilation albums
Alternative rock compilation albums
New wave compilation albums
Sire Records compilation albums